Nieuwe Tuinen is a hamlet in the Dutch province of South Holland. It is a part of the municipality of Westland, and lies about 5 km north of Maassluis.

The statistical area "Nieuwe Tuinen", which also can include the surrounding countryside, has a population of around 140.

References

Populated places in South Holland
Westland (municipality), Netherlands